Gadjah Mada University (abbreviated as UGM) is a public research university located in Sleman, Special Region of Yogyakarta, Indonesia. Officially founded on 19 December 1949, Gadjah Mada University is one of the oldest and largest institutions of higher education in the country. It is widely known as the largest and the first state university in the nation. It has been credited as one of the best universities in Indonesia. In the 2023 QS World Universities Ranking, UGM is ranked 1st in Indonesia and 231st in the world.

When the university was established in the 1940s under Dutch rule, it was the first medicine faculty freely open to native Indonesians, at a time when native education was often restricted.

Comprising 18 faculties and 27 research centers, UGM offers 68 undergraduate, 23 diploma, 104 master and specialist, 43 doctorate and 4 clusters of post doctoral study programs. The university has enrolled approximately 55,000 students, 1,187 foreign students, and has 2,500 faculty members.

The university is named after Gajah Mada, a 14th-century leader of the Majapahit Empire of Java, considered by some historians to be the nation's first unifier; the university's name still reflects the old Dutch-era spelling. The seventh and current President of Indonesia, Joko Widodo, earned his degree in forestry at UGM in 1985.

History

UGM was the first state university in Indonesia, established as Universiteit Negeri Gadjah Mada (UNGM) when Indonesia was still facing threats from the Netherlands, who wanted to regain control. At the time, the capital of Indonesia had moved from Jakarta to Yogyakarta.

UGM was established through Government Regulation (PP) No. 23 of 1949, regarding the merger of colleges to form a university. Although the regulations were dated 16 December, UGM's inauguration took place on 19 December, intentionally chosen to coincide with the anniversary of the Dutch invasion of Yogyakarta, exactly one year prior on 19 December 1948. The intentional date was meant to show that one year after the Netherlands had invaded the city, the government would establish a nationwide university there.

When it was founded, UGM had six faculties: Medicine, Dentistry, and Pharmacy; Law, Economics, Social and Political Sciences; Engineering; Letters, Pedagogy and Philosophy; Agriculture; and Veterinary Medicine.

From 1952 until 1972, the Faculty of Law, Social and Political Sciences was split into two faculties: the Surabaya branch of the Faculty of Law, Social, and Political Sciences; and the Faculty of Education and Teacher Training, which was integrated into IKIP Yogyakarta (now Universitas Negeri Yogyakarta).

During its initial years of Dutch resistance, the university taught literature and law in the buildings and other facilities belonging to the palace of Sultan Hamengkubuwono IX, who volunteered his palace for the university's use. UGM gradually established a campus of its own in Bulaksumur, on the northern side of Yogyakarta, and now occupies an area of three square kilometres.

Faculties and Schools

The UGM main building is called the Balairung, a rectorate building, in Sleman. Nearby is the Grha Sabha Pramana, a large building utilized for graduation ceremonies, with an adjoining square used for sport and recreation. There is also a university library and a sports center, consisting of a stadium, tennis court, and basketball field.

Most of the main campus is located in Sleman, with the small parts (such as part of the Vocational School and part of the Faculty of Social and Political Sciences) is located within Yogyakarta city.

The UGM administration is divided into 18 faculties, offering study programs from the undergraduate to post doctoral level. There is also a vocational school offering vocational study programmes.

Faculties

 Faculty of Biology
 Faculty of Agricultural Technology
 Faculty of Agriculture
 Faculty of Animal Science
 Faculty of Cultural Sciences (Arts and Humanities)
 Faculty of Dentistry
 Faculty of Economics and Business
 Faculty of Engineering
 Faculty of Forestry
 Faculty of Geography
 Faculty of Law
 Faculty of Mathematics and Natural Sciences
 Faculty of Medicine
 Faculty of Pharmacy
 Faculty of Philosophy
 Faculty of Psychology
 Faculty of Social and Political Science
 Faculty of Veterinary Medicine

International Programmes

Gadjah Mada university provides some major programs in English and admits international students.  In 2018, there are 1,334 international students who originally come from Asian countries, 566 European students, 214 Australian/Oceanian students, 101 Canadian & US students, 58 African students, and 12 South American students who study in the 18 faculties of Gadjah Mada University.

Undergraduate Programmes
The undergraduate programs in English as follows.

 Accounting
 Management
 Economics 
 Law
 Medicine
 Pharmacy
 Computer Science
 Electronics & Instrumentation
 Psychology
 Philosophy
 Cultural Sciences
 Chemistry
 Mathematics
 Geophysics
 Biology
 Animal Science
 International Relations
 Public Policy & Management
 Communication Science
 Geodetic & Geomatical Engineering
 Civil Engineering
 Chemical Engineering
 Electrical Engineering & Information Technology

Computer Science International Undergraduate Programme
CSIUP began in the 2012 academic year. It offers undergraduate computer science classes in English. It teaches algorithm and software design, intelligent systems, programmable logic and embedded systems, and mobile computing. The Faculty of Mathematics and Natural Sciences has been teaching Computer Science courses since 1987 (BSc), 2000 (MSc), and 2003 (PhD), organized jointly by the Department of Mathematics and the Department of Physics, which has also offered courses in Electronics and Instrumentation since 1987 (BSc). In 2010, the Department of Computer Science and Electronics (DCSE) was formed by merging Computer Science resources within the Department of Mathematics with the Electronics and Instrumentation group within the Department of Physics. Students of DCSE have won gold medals in robotics competitions both nationally and internationally (in Korea in 2012 with a humanoid robot, and in the US in 2013 with a legged robot).

Medicine International Undergraduate Programme
In 2002, UGM began offering an English-language-based medicine programme for overseas and Indonesian students to study medicine with an international standard curriculum. The International Medicine Programme is over five years, with the first three and a half years being study and a further one and a half years of clinical rotations. The programme is designed around a problem based learning approach, making use of small study groups.

International Graduate Programmes
The graduate programs in English as follows

 Management & Business (MBA)
 Law (LLM)
 Economics Development (M.Ec.Dev)
 Medicine
 Civil Engineering
 Chemical Engineering
 Geological & Geo-resources Engineering
 Material Engineering
 Electrical Engineering & Information Technology
 Religious and Cross-cultural Studies
 Disaster Management
 Biology
 Chemistry
 Computer Science
 Art & Humanity
 International Relations
 Public Policy & Management
 Communication Science
 Agricultural Science
 Geographic Science
 Forestry Science
 Anthropology
 American Studies

Schools

 UGM Graduate School
 UGM Vocational School

Business school
In 1988, UGM opened a master's programme in management (MM-UGM), to train students in business practices. The program is a collaboration with the University of Kentucky and Temple University. The Faculty of Economics and Business UGM is ranked among 5% of world best business schools after it received an international Association to Advance Collegiate Schools of Business (AACSB) accreditation. In 2010, UGM opened a similar campus in South Jakarta, Jakarta.

Medical school
The Faculty of Medicine UGM is one of the oldest medical schools in Indonesia, having been established on 5 March 1946. It is ranked number 72 by the Times Higher Education Supplement 2006 for biomedicine.

Engineering school
Prior to being part of the Gadjah Mada University, the faculty of engineering was already providing engineering education under name of STT Jogjakarta since 1946. After the university of Gadjah Mada establishment meeting on May 20, 1949, STT Jogjakarta changed its name to the faculty of engineering of Gadjah Mada University and admit 205 students. The faculty consists of 3 departments: Civil Engineering, Mechanical Engineering, and Chemical Engineering.
Between 1957 and 1966, the engineering faculty received support from the University of California Los Angeles (UCLA). UCLA gave books, equipment, and scholarship to lecturers as well as sent their professors to teach in the faculty of engineering of Gadjah Mada University.

Currently, the faculty of engineering has 8 departments: Architecture & urban planning, civil & environmental engineering, geodetic engineering, chemical engineering, mechanical & industrial engineering, electrical and informatics engineering, nuclear and physic engineering, and geological engineering. Each department has been accredited by ABET (USA), IChemE (UK), ASIIN (Germany), KAAB (South Korea), AUN QA (ASEAN), IABEE (Indonesia), and BAN-PT (Indonesia)

Double Degree Programmes 
Gadjah Mada University provides the undergraduate & graduate Double Degree programmes by collaboration with selected and prestigious university at USA, United Kingdom, France, The Netherlands, Germany, Australia and Japan, as follows:

 Agricultural Science
 Agricultural Technology (Agricultural & Food Engineering)
 Economics & Business
 Economics Development
 Mathematics & Natural Sciences
 Medicine
 Forestry
 Biology
 Biotechnology
 Law
 Civil Engineering & Environmental Infrastructure Technology
 Chemical Engineering
 Electrical Engineering & Information Technology
 Physical & Nuclear Engineering
 Mechanical & Industrial Engineering
 Geological Engineering
 Architecture, Urban Design & Regional Planning
 Agro-Industrial Technology
 Humanitarian Engineering
 Pharmacy
 Veterinary Medicine
 Animal Science
 Art & Humanity
 Public Administration, Management & Policy
 Sociology
 International Relations
 Computer Science
 Disaster Management
 Health Policy & Management
 Geo Information for Spacial Planning & Disaster Risk Management
 Coastal & River Basin Area Management

Post Doctoral Programmes

 Cluster of Social & Humanity Sciences
 Cluster of Medical & Health Sciences
 Cluster of Science & Technology
 Cluster of Agro Complex / Life & Agro Sciences

Gadjah Mada University, SDGs Corner 
The Sustainable Development Goals (SDGs) or Global Goals are a collection of 17 interlinked global goals designed to be a "shared blueprint for peace and prosperity for people and the planet, now and into the future"

The 17 SDGs are: No Poverty, Zero Hunger, Good Health and Well-being, Quality Education, Gender Equality, Clean Water and Sanitation, Affordable and Clean Energy, Decent Work and Economic Growth, Industry, innovation and Infrastructure, Reduced Inequality, Sustainable Cities and Communities, Responsible Consumption and Production, Climate Action, Life Below Water, Life On Land, Peace, Justice, and Strong Institutions, Partnerships for the Goals.

Research Centers
UGM has 24 university-level research and study centers:

 Center for Agroecology and Land Resources Studies
 Center for Asia - Pacific Studies
 Center for Disaster Studies
 Research Center for Biotechnology
 Center for Economic and Public Policy Studies
 Center for Economic Democracy Studies
 Center for Energy Studies
 Center for Clinical Pharmacology Studies and Drug Policy
 Center for Security and Peace Studies.
 Center for Cultural Studies
 Center for Population and Policy Studies
 Center For Environmental Studies
 Center for Pancasila Studies
 Center for Pharmaceutical Industry and Health Technology Studies
 Center for Food and Nutrition Studies
 Center for Tourism Studies
 Center for Rural and Regional Development Studies
 Research Center for Management of Biological Resources
 Center for World Trade Studies
 Center for Studies in Regional Development Planning 
 Center for Southeast Asian Social Studies
 Center For Marine Resource Development and Technology
 Center For Transportation and Logistics Studies
 Center For Women Studies

UGM maintains the Integrated Research and Testing Laboratory (LPPT), which is the university's central laboratory.

International Collaborations
Gadjah Mada University has been collaborating with many overseas universities such as

 Harvard University, USA
 Yale University, USA
 University of Chicago, USA
 University of California Berkeley, USA
 Johns Hopkins University, USA
 Cornell University, USA
 Columbia University, USA
 University of Pennsylvania, USA
 Northwestern University, USA
 UCLA, USA
 University of Washington-Seattle, USA
 University of Wisconsin-Madison, USA
 Michigan State University, USA
 University of Illinois at Urbana-Champaign, USA
 University of North Carolina, Chapel Hill, USA
 University of California Davis, USA
 University of Texas at Austin, USA
 Purdue University, USA
 University of Oxford, UK
 University of Cambridge, UK
 UCL London, UK
 Imperial College London, UK
 University of Edinburgh, UK
 King's College London, UK
 LSE, UK
 University of Manchester, UK
 University of Bristol, UK
 University of Glasgow, UK
 University of London, UK
 University of Warwick, UK
 University of Southampton, UK
 University of Birmingham, UK
 University of Leeds, UK
 University of Nottingham, UK
 Australian National University, Australia
 University of Melbourne, Australia
 University of Sydney, Australia
 Monash University, Australia
 University of New South Wales, Australia
 University of Queensland, Australia
 Amsterdam University, Netherlands
 Erasmus University Rotterdam, Netherlands
 Leiden University, Netherlands
 TU Delft, Netherlands
 Utrecht University, Netherlands
 Groningen University, Netherlands
 Vrije Universiteit Amsterdam, Netherlands
 Wageningen University & Research, Netherlands
 ITC Enschede, Netherlands
 Universiteit Maastricht, Netherlands
 KU Leuven, Belgium
 Ghent University, Belgium
 Copenhagen University, Denmark
 Copenhagen Business School, Denmark
 University of Helsinki, Finland
 University of Tokyo, Japan
 Kyoto University, Japan
 Osaka University, Japan
 Tokyo Institute of Technology, Japan
 Tohoku University, Japan
 Hokkaido University, Japan
 Nagoya University, Japan
 Kyushu University, Japan
 RWTH Aachen, Germany
 Universität Heidelberg, Germany
 Humboldt-Universitat zu Berlin, Germany
 Freie Universitat Berlin, Germany
 Karlsruhe Institute of Technology, Germany
 University of Leipzig, Germany
 Gottingen University, Germany
 Tubingen University, Germany
 University of Freiburg, Germany
 University of Toronto, Canada
 University of British Columbia, Canada
 University of Montpellier, France
 Sciences Po, France
 Universite Paris I Pantheon - Sorbonne, France
 Grenoble Alpes University, France
 Sapienza University of Rome, Italy
 University of Vienna, Austria
 TU Wien, Austria
 Moscow State University, Russia
 University of Auckland, New Zealand
 Lund University, Sweden
 Uppsala University, Sweden
 University of Zurich, Switzerland
 EPFL, Switzerland
 Tsinghua University, China
 Seoul National University, South Korea
 National Taiwan University, Taiwan
 National University of Singapore, Singapore
 Nanyang Technological University, Singapore
 University of Malaya, Malaysia
 Chulalongkorn University, Thailand
 University of Philippines, Philippines

Achievements
In 2013, the chemistry undergraduate program received accreditation from the Royal Society of Chemistry (RSC) in the United Kingdom, the largest European-based international organization devoted to the advancement of chemical science. The first such international accreditation received by the university, it is effective from 5 March 2013 until March 2018.

Rankings

The university was ranked 231st in the world by the QS World University Rankings for 2023, being the highest ranked school in Indonesia.

In 2022, UGM was ranked in the top 50 in the world, according to Times Higher Education (THE) Impact Ranking, using seven criteria of Sustainable Development Goals (SDGs). THE Impact Ranking this year included 1406 prestigious institutions throughout the world. In the overall assessment this year, UGM ranked 87th in the world. UGM ranked 10th under the No Poverty indicator, 12th under Decent Work & Economic Growth, 20th under Zero Hunger, 50th under the Peace, Justice, and Strong Institution indicators.

In 2021, UGM ranks 16th in the world for Zero Hunger, 24th in the Partnership for the Goals indicator, 25th in the world for No Poverty indicators, and 26th in the world for the indicator for Mainland Ecosystems (Life on Land). For the Clean Water and Sanitation indicator, UGM ranks 34th in the world, the Decent Work and Economic Growth indicator rank 41st in the world. For the Reduced Inequalities indicator, it ranks 49th in the world.

UGM also ranks 51–100 in the world for 5 SDGs, 101-200 for the 2 SDGs, and 201-300 for the other three SDGs.

Student achievement
  

 The Silver Prize of the International Genetically Engineered Machine (iGEM) Competition 2021, Paris, France
 3rd winner of Venezuela Energy Solutions Case Study Competition, Venezuelan American Petroleum Association (VAPA) sponsored by CITGO Petroleum Corporation, 2022
 1st winner of Schlumberger Digital Forum,  Luzern, Switzerland, 2022
 1st winner of World Bank Group Youth Summit 2022, Washington DC, USA
 5th winner of the International Commercial Mediation Competition (ICMC) 18th International Chamber of Commerce 2023, Paris, France
 The Most Innovative Presentation of Krannert Human Resource Case Competition and Executive Conference, Purdue University, USA, 2013
 The Best Reviewer Award of International Accounting Section, American Accounting Association, San Antonio, Texas, USA. 2014
 1st winner of World Bank Group Youth Summit, Case Challenge Competition,  Washington, DC, USA, 2021
 The Most Outstanding Delegate & Honorable Mention Nottingham University Model United Nation (NUMUN) Competition, 2016
 Gold Prize of International Case Competition, Hong Kong, 2021
 3rd winner of 5th Foreign Direct Investment Moot Competition at Suffolk University Law School, Boston, USA, 2012
 Runner-Up of International Humanitarian Law Moot Court Competition (IHL MCC) Asia Pacific, 2022
 Overall Highest Team Ranking of Foreign Direct Investment International Arbitration Meet, Buenos Aires, Argentina, 2016
 4th winner of International Criminal Court Moot Court Competition (ICCMCC), Den Haag, The Netherlands, 2014
 Honorable Mentions of Eric E. Bergsten Award of International Commercial Arbitration Moot (Vis Moot), 29th Willem C. Vis (West) Moot, 2022
 1st winner of The Nuremberg Moot Court Competition, The Netherlands, 2022,
 The winner of 16th International Veterinary Medicine Student Scientific Research Congress, Istanbul, Republic Turkey, 2014
 The winner of Agricultural Engineering – Annual Regional Convention (AE-ARC), Philippine,  2022
 The winner of Agricultural Engineering - Annual Regional Convention (AE-ARC), Malaysia, 2019
 2nd winner of International Microbiology, Parasitology, and Immunology Competition (SIMPIC), Thailand, 2017 
 Best Overall Presentation of International Forestry Student Association,  Hokkaido, Japan, 2021
 Silver Medal on Giant Jamboree, International Genetically Engineered Machine (iGEM) Competition, France, 2021
 The winner of The International Pharmaceutical Students’ Federation / IPSF Pharma Olympics, 2020
 Gold Medal & Best Award of The International Invention and Innovation Exhibition (i-ENVEX) Competition, Malaysia, 2011 
 The winner of International Challenge of Emergency Medicine (KKU ICEM) Competition, Thailand, 2020
 The winner of The Asian-Oceania Medical Students' Conferences (AMSC) Competition, Seoul, Korea, 2022.
 3rd winner of The Model Satellite Competition, Turkey, 2022
 The winner of DAAD-Fraunhofer Technopreneur Award, Germany, 2007 
 The winner of Mondialogo Engineering Award, Stuttgart, Germany, 2009.
 The winner of International Mathematics Competition (IMC), Bulgaria, 2021
 3rd winner & honorable mention of International Mathematics Competition (IMC), Blagoevgrad, Bulgaria, 2018
 1st, 2nd & honorable mention of International Mathematics Competition (lMC) Blagoevgrad, Bulgaria, 2015
 3rd winner of International Mathematics Competition for University Students (IMC), Blagoevgrad, Bulgaria, 2008.
 3rd winner of International Scientific Olympiad on Mathematics (ISOM), Teheran, Iran, 2008.
 The winner of Formula Student Netherlands (FSN) Competition, The Netherlands, 2022
 The Best Public Safety App on “Public Safety App Challenge” at California, USA, 2014.
 Best Chapter of The World Champions of Society of Exploration Geophysicists, Denver, Colorado, USA, 2014
 6th winner of The International CanSat Competition, American Astronautical Society (AAS), Virginia Tech, Blacksburg, VA, USA, 2022
 1st-place Winner of Battery-Electric Prototype category, Shell Eco-Marathon, 2022.
 1st-place Winner of Green Wave Environmental Care Competition, organized by Sembcorp Marine Ltd, Singapore, 2021. 
 1st-place Winner of Indonesia Flying Robot Contest at 2021.
 1st-place Winner of NewQuest Young Geothermal Explorationist Competition, 2021.
 Best Paper-International Conference on Sustainable Civil Engineering Structures and Construction Materials (SCESCM) in University of Technology Mara, Malaysia, 2020.
 1st-place Winner of Electric Car Design - PLN Innovation & Competition in Electricity (ICE), 2021.
 Best Student Prize - The Gawler Challenge by Unearthed dan Department for Energy and Mining, Government of South Australia, 2020.
 1st-place Winner - CulturIS-3D on International Invention and Innovation Competition (InIIC) Malaysia, 2020.
 2nd-place Winner of United States Annual Student CanSat Competition organized by American Astronautical Society & sponsored by NASA, 2020.
 1st-place Winner of BRI x Google Hackaton Competition, 2020.
 Gold Award - Architecture and Alumni Choice Award - Asian Young Designer Award, 2017.
 Gold Winner of Robot Contest in Connecticut USA, 2018.
 1st-place Winner of Slum Housing Improvement Design of Public Work and Public Housing Ministry competition, 2015.
 1st-place winner of Fire-Fighting category, 1st-place winner of Stand Balancing, and 2nd-place winner of Walker Challenge, Robogames competition, USA 2012
 3rd Best Memorial Award Asia Cup 2012. International Law Moot Court Competition Asia Cup 2012, Japan
 1st Best Mooter (Mr. Dylan Jesse Andrian), Hong Kong Red Cross International Humanitarian Law Moot 2022
 The Best Technical Innovation Award for eSemar Xperimental, Shell Eco-Marathon (SEM) 2011, Malaysia
 Winner of Outstanding Achievement in 62nd Intel International Science and Engineering Fair – China Association for Science and Technology 2011 in Los Angeles
 1st winner of Creative Robot, The 13th International Robot Olympiad 2011, Indonesia
 The Standard Commercial Movie Category Award, 7th GATSBY Student CM Award

Student life

Student orientation

Every year UGM welcomes new undergraduate students by holding a one-week student orientation session called PPSMB Palapa (Pelatihan Pembelajar Sukses bagi Mahasiswa Baru Palapa, "Training for New Students to be Successful Learners", named after Palapa oath), which involves a short course introducing UGM's common knowledge, values, rules, and soft-skill education. On the last day of the program, there is a closing ceremony where students make a formation of a symbol or logo. In 2018, the students created a formation called Bersatu Nusantara Indonesia ("United Indonesian Archipelago") with the Indonesian national flag, to encourage a spirit of unity across differences in the country.

Community service
UGM organizes a community service called KKN-PPM (short for Kuliah Kerja Nyata-Pembelajaran Pemberdayaan Masyarakat or "Student Community Service-Community Empowerment Learning", in English), which is obligatory for undergraduate students. KKN-PPM is a research-based community service offered three times each academic year, in the middle of both the odd semester and even semester and between these two semesters. Not only local students joining the KKN, but also international academicians, including lecturers and students, are involved in KKN-PPM UGM. In 2011, 150 international students participated in KKN-PPM, coming from many countries, such as South Korea, Australia, France, the US, and Norway.

Other activities

The Sports Activities Unit is coordinated by the Secretariat of Joint Sports, and the Arts Unit is coordinated by the Joint Secretariat of Arts.

Sports activities include swimming, diving, inkai karate, kenpō, the Indonesian martial art pencak silat (including the variants of pencak silat merpati putih, self periasi pencak silat, pencak silat pro patria, and pencak silat setia hati terate), taekwondo, judo, hockey, soccer, softball, volleyball, basketball, athletics, equestrian, bridge, badminton, chess, and tennis.

Arts activities include Arts Style Yogyakarta (Swagayugama), Art Style Surakarta, Balinese dance, creative dance, photography, fine arts, Gamma Band, marching band, ‘’keroncong’’, student choir, theatre, and others arts.

Other activities include Publisher Student Press Agency, Mapagama, Student Health Unit, Scout, Satmenwa, Cooperative Students "Kopma UGM", and AIESEC.

Spirituality activities include the Unit of Islamic Spirituality (Jama'ah Shalahuddin), Unit of Catholic Spirituality, Christian Spirituality Unit, Hindu Spirituality Unit, Buddhism and Spiritual Unit.

Reasoning activities include the Interdisciplinary Unit of Scientific Reasoning, Gama Scholar Reasoning Unit, and English Debating Society.

Transportation
There are sepeda kampus (campus bike) service available inside UGM, with 8 stations and 5 substations across the campus.

UGM campus is also served by Trans Jogja bus stations in several locations, notably near the Faculty of Medicine, Vocational School and lecturer's eastern housing.

Other facilities

UGM Campus Mosque is a mosque owned by UGM and situated within its campus. It was designed entirely by the students of UGM Architecture Engineering department. It holds maximum capacity of 10,000 pilgrims, making it one of the largest mosques in Southeast Asia.

Madya Stadium, the softball/baseball field, and the tennis courts are located in the valley of UGM. The stadium can be used for football, athletics, hockey, and other activities. These facilities are available to UGM students, staff and the public.

The Student Center Hall is used for sports activities such as basketball, volleyball, badminton, and martial arts, and for exhibitions and artistic performances.

The open field in the valley of UGM can be used for musical performances or other student activities that require a wide open space.

Some of Gadjah Mada University's inventions are displayed in the University Museum along with the university's collections and memorabilia.

UGM also has several student dormitories across Yogyakarta

Controversies

Yogyakarta Principles

The Yogyakarta Principles—a set of principles set forth at Geneva, Switzerland, which were intended to apply international human rights law guidelines in support of the human rights of lesbian, gay, bisexual, and transgender (LGBT) people—were developed at Gadjah Mada University.

However, the Yogyakarta communities, civil societies, and the Sultanate of Yogyakarta have not subscribed to these principles. The principles were deemed as being against the Constitution of Indonesia and Pancasila ideology by the Regional People's Representative Council (DPRD), Islamic and religious groups, and civil prosecutors, who attacked the LGBT community as being suspect in "promoting communism or westernization", although the Yogyakarta Principles merely address ending violence, abuse, and discrimination of LGBT people.

2016 student demonstration 
In 2016, more than 1000 of UGM's student and staff flocked to the university's headquarters for a demonstration that was said to be the biggest after the 1998 national demonstration. The demonstration went peacefully, with no damage reported by the university, although it got a bit heated when the university's rector, Mrs. Dwikorita Karnawati, claimed that the demonstration was a simulation officially held by UGM. There were three factors that led to this demonstration: tuition (uang kuliah tunggal) that was deemed too expensive; the university's status as a "state university with corporation status" (PTNBH), which led to the tuition fee rate ruling by the university; and to stop the relocation of so-called "bonbin" canteen located between Faculty of Cultural Sciences and Faculty of Psychology.

2017 refusal to report alleged sexual assault 

On 5 November 2018, UGM's student publication body BPPM Balairung through its online portal Balairungpress.com published an article containing the account, from a female student ("Agni"), of an alleged rape she experienced at the hands of a male fellow student ("HS") while doing a student work experience (Kuliah Kerja Nyata – KKN) program in Seram Island, Maluku in June 2017. However, the case is still under investigation.

When learning of the rape allegation, UGM–KKN officials chose not to forward Agni's accusation to the police. Instead, they were skeptical of Agni's account. Regardless, HS was pulled from the KKN program about a week later because he was deemed to be "incompatible" with other KKN participants.

After Agni returned to Yogyakarta in September 2017, she received a C-grade for the program, apparently in retaliation for the shame her allegation had brought upon an official. Agni then filed a formal complaint about her alleged rape to higher-ranking officials at the university, who raised her grade to A/B but still did not report HS to law enforcement. Instead, the university agreed to pay for the counseling Agni had been seeking to deal with her trauma, as well as requiring HS to go to counseling as well. HS was allowed to take part in another KKN program the semester after the alleged rape, and he is expected to graduate soon.

UGM spokesperson Iva Ariani confirmed the account as told in Balairungpress.com and says that the university is now taking further steps to investigate the rape allegation. She admitted to Kompas that the case was happened, that UGM has "extraordinary empathy" for the victim and also "concerned" about the incident.

Notable alumni

University rectors
 Sukadji Ranuwihardjo – Rector of Gadjah Mada University (1973–1981)
 Pratikno – Rector of Gadjah Mada University (2012–2014), current Minister of State Secretariat

Education
 Anies Baswedan – Minister of Education and Culture of the Republic of Indonesia (2014–2016), academician, former Governor of Special Capital Region of Jakarta (2017-2022)
 Yahya Muhaimin – Minister of Education (1999 - 2001)
  – Minister of Education (2004 - 2009) & Minister of Finance (1999 - 2000)

Economics
 Adrianus Mooy - former Governor of the Central Bank of Indonesia (1988–1993)
 J Soedrajad Djiwandono – former Governor of the Central Bank of Indonesia (1993–1998), Junior Minister of Trade (1988–1993)
 Perry Warjiyo – Governor of the Central Bank of Indonesia

Law
 Mahfud MD - Former Justice of the Constitutional Court, Minister of Coordinating Political, Legal, and Security Affairs of Indonesia (2019–Present)
 Saldi Isra - Justice of the Constitutional Court (2017–Present)
 Albertina Ho -  former Judge at the General Court, Supervision Board of Corruption Eradication Commission (2019–Present) 
 Abdul Rahman Saleh - former Attorney General of Indonesia and Judge of the Supreme Court.

Health
 Siti Fadillah Supari – Minister of Health (2004–2009), cardiologist
 Teuku Jacob - Indonesian Palaeoanthropologist, physician, anatomist
 Terawan Agus Putranto - former Minister of Health
 Haryono Suyono - former Coordinating Minister for the Peoples' Welfare
 Adi Utarini - public health researcher and one of TIME's 100 most Influential People of 2021

Politics
Dewa Made Beratha – Governor of Bali (1998–2008)
Boediono – Vice President of Indonesia (2009–2014), former Coordinating Minister for Economic Affairs, former Governor of the Central Bank of Indonesia
Brigida Antónia Correia - East Timor MP (2007–18) & agricultural scientist
Sri Sultan Hamengkubuwono X – 10th and current Sultan of Yogyakarta, Governor of the modern Yogyakarta Special Region
Airlangga Hartarto – politician, Minister of Industry (2016 - 2019), Coordinating Minister for Economic Affairs (2019–Present)
 Retno Marsudi – current Minister of Foreign Affairs, former Indonesian Ambassador to the Netherlands (2012–2015)
 Fadel Muhammad – Vice President of ASEAN Business Forum, Governor of Gorontalo (2001–2006)
 Ganjar Pranowo – Politician & Governor of Central Java (2013–2018) & (2018–Present)
 Amien Rais – former leader of Muhammadiyah
Ben Mang Reng Say – politician, founder and rector of Atma Jaya Catholic University
 Budiman Sudjatmiko – politician
 Joko Widodo – President of Indonesia, former Governor of Jakarta, former Mayor of Surakarta

Religion
 Ahmad Wahib – progressive Islamic intellectual

Arts and culture
 Sapardi Djoko Damono – poet, professor at University of Indonesia
 Artika Sari Devi – actress, model, Puteri Indonesia 2004 and Top 15 Miss Universe 2005 in Bangkok, Thailand
 Helmi Johannes – Voice of America (VOA) Indonesia Executive Producer (2005–present)
 Umar Kayam – author and former President of Jakarta Art Institute
 Kuntowijoyo – historian, author
 Eka Kurniawan – author, first Indonesian nominated for the Man Booker International Prize
 Emha Ainun Nadjib – poet, public speaker
 Jakob Oetama – founder of Kompas & CEO of Kompas Gramedia
 Susanto Pudjomartono – second chief editor of The Jakarta Post (1991–2003), Ambassador to Russia (2003–2008)
 Willibrordus S. Rendra – poet, lyricist, dramatist, and stage writer
 Putu Wijaya – novelist

Science and technology
 Marlina Flassy - anthropologist and Dean of the Faculty of Social and Political Sciences at Cenderawasih University, where she was the first woman dean, and first indigenous Papuan to lead her faculty.
Basuki Hadimuljono — Minister of Public Works & Housing (2014 - 2019) & (2019 - Present)
 Herman Johannes – Rector, scientist, former Minister of Public Works (1950–1951)
 Soenarno - Minister of Public Works (2001 - 2004)
Djoko Kirmanto — Minister of Public Works & Housing (2004 - 2014)
Sutopo Purwo Nugroho—Leading spokesperson on issues about natural disasters in Indonesia
 Mohammad Sadli – Minister of Mineral Resources (1973–1978), Minister of Labor (1971–1973), Professor of Economics at University of Indonesia
 Lolo Soetoro – Geographer and stepfather of Barack Obama, the 44th President of the United States
 Budi Karya Sumadi — Minister of Transportation (2016 - 2019) & (2019 - Present)

See also

 Education in Indonesia
 List of universities in Indonesia
 List of Gadjah Mada University people, including notable alumni
 Yogyakarta Principles

References

External links
 Official website (English version)

 
Educational institutions established in 1949
ASEAN University Network
Universities using Problem-based learning
Veterinary schools in Indonesia
Forestry education
1949 establishments in Indonesia
Universities in the Special Region of Yogyakarta
Universities in Jakarta
Indonesian state universities